Duncan MacDonald may refer to:

Duncan MacDonald (politician) (1885–1977), Australian politician
Duncan Black MacDonald (1863–1943), American Orientalist
Duncan MacDonald (athlete) (born 1949), American Olympic long-distance runner

See also
Duncan McDonald (disambiguation)